Trogglodynamite is the second studio album by the English rock band The Troggs, released in 1967 (picture shows the German edition, the UK version had a completely different cover). The album was re-released in 2003 with eight bonus tracks by Repertoire Records.

Track listing

"Trogglodynamite" UK original track listing

Side 1
 "I Can Only Give You Everything" (Tommy Scott, Phil Coulter) — 3:24
 "Last Summer" (Reg Presley) — 2:55
 "Meet Jaсqueline" (Albert Hammond) — 2:14
 "Oh No" (Pete Staples) — 2:05
 "It's Too Late" (Ronnie Bond) — 2:08
 "No. 10 Downing Street" (Larry Page, David Matthews) — 2:15
 "Mona (I Need You Baby)" (Bo Diddley) — 5:09

Side 2
 "I Want You to Come into My Life" (Reg Presley) — 2:25
 "Let Me Tell You Babe" (Joe Sherman, George David Weiss) — 2:49
 "Little Queenie" (Chuck Berry) — 2:51
 "Cousin Jane" (Larry Page, David Matthews) — 2:25
 "You Can't Beat It" (Reg Presley) — 2:21
 "Baby Come Closer" (Terry Dwyer, Jack Price) — 2:33
 "It's Over" (Reg Presley) — 2:11

2003 CD re-issue bonus tracks
 "Any Way That You Want Me" (Chip Taylor) — 2:54
 "66-5-4-3-2-1 (I Know What You Want)" (Reg Presley) — 2:33
 "Give It to Me" (Reg Presley) — 2:13
 "You're Lying" (Larry Page, Colin Frechter) — 2:21
 "Night of the Long Grass" (Reg Presley) — 3:04
 "Girl in Black" (Colin Frechter) — 2:01
 "Evil Woman" (George David Weiss) — 2:53
 "Sweet Madelaine" (Reg Presley) — 2:50

Personnel
Reg Presley — lead vocals
Chris Britton — guitar, backing vocals
Pete Staples — bass, backing vocals
Ronnie Bond — drums, lead vocals on "It's Too Late"

References

1967 albums
The Troggs albums
Albums produced by Larry Page (singer)